The 1882–83 FAW Welsh Cup was the sixth edition of the annual knockout tournament for competitive football teams in Wales.

First round

Corwen failed to appear for the arranged fixture.

Replays

Second round

Third round

Replays

Fourth round

Semifinals

Final

References

Bibliography

Notes 

 The History of the Welsh Cup 1877-1993 by Ian Garland (1991) 
 Welsh Football Data Archive

1882-83
1882–83 domestic association football cups